Brimfield Township is located in Peoria County, Illinois, United States. As of the 2010 census, its population was 1,235 and it contained 503 housing units.  The village of Brimfield is located in Brimfield Township.

Geography

Demographics

References

External links
City-data.com
Illinois State Archives

Townships in Peoria County, Illinois
Peoria metropolitan area, Illinois
Townships in Illinois
1849 establishments in Illinois
Populated places established in 1849